Mark Gustavson (born September 19, 1959 in Brooklyn, New York) is an American composer of contemporary classical music.

Biography
Gustavson lives on eastern Long Island and teaches at various universities in the New York City area, including Adelphi University and Nassau Community College. He graduated from the University of Illinois in 1981 and received the D.M.A. from Columbia University in 1990. Gustavson also studied at the Sweelinck Conservatory with Ton De Leeuw on a Fulbright Fellowship in 1985-86 and was a composition fellow at Tanglewood in 1979. His primary composition teachers were Chinary Ung, Ben Johnston and Fred Lerdahl.

Music
Western classical music, Folk music from around the world, and Jazz blended with Eastern and Western philosophy have all influenced Gustavson's style. He mostly favors notated music that often sounds improvised. Form is often based on different approaches to variations influenced by naturally occurring cycles. Rhythm can at times be very complex or deceptively simple; for example, the third movement of Quintet for clarinet, two violins, viola, and cello is a four-voice canon of continuous eighth notes that create a background for the solo clarinet. Because of the unpredictable entrances of each voice, an improvisatory quality is suggested. In A Fool's Journey, it is the complex textures that create the illusion of improvisation. The complex layering of lines or polyphony in this example from "A Fool's Journey" purposely avoids the coming together of the independent voices. The Prelude to "Lament" for piano solo demonstrates another way to create the sense of improvisation by using a basso ostinato in the left hand and a rhythmically free right hand. One more example from a recent work "Turning" for bass clarinet, percussion, piano, and double bass explores many ways of creating the illusion of improvisation. This example demonstrates metrical independence of the four instruments, and at times, simultaneously in four different meters. 

His music has been recognized with various grants, awards, and prizes, including grants from the, Alice M. Ditson Fund, the American Academy of Arts and Letters Walter Hinrichsen Award (1987), the Joseph H. Bearns Prize, the BMI Student Composer Award (1979, 1982, 1983), and the ASCAP Foundation Morton Gould Young Composer Award.

In the first decade of the 21st century, Gustavson's attention turned to texts and vocal music. Two works of note are The Fisherman Songs for bass/baritone and piano and Lament, a monodrama for bass/baritone, bass clarinet, percussion, piano, female chorus, and contrabass, using a poem "Lament" by Dylan Thomas and the Welsh hymn “Llef”.

Prelude from Lament for bass clarinet, percussion, piano, and double bass is performed by the pianist Jacob Rhodebeck and Turning was performed by the Stony Brook Contemporary Chamber Players. A recording with Quintet performed by Contempo and Dissolving Images for solo piano performed by Lisa Moore are available on Albany Records,. and "Dissolving Images" and "Quintet" are published by Edition Peters.

Select list of compositions
Orchestra

Dust Dance (2010)
Hymn to the Vanished (2001) for string orchestra
Silent Moon (1998)
Waves (1988)

Band & Wind ensemble
Hymn to the Vanished (2017) arranged for concert band
The Emperor's Music (2000) for twelve antiphonal solo brass

Chamber
Wheel (2014) for violin and piano
Hymn to the Vanished (2013) for clarinet and piano
Turning (2012) for bass clarinet, percussion, piano and double bass
Chiftetelli (2010) for clarinet, 2 violins, viola and cello
A Fool's Journey (1999) for flute (pic, alto), clarinet (bcl), percussion, violin and cello
Two of Cups (1999) for clarinet and viola
Albion (1997) for wind quintet
Quintet (1993) for clarinet, 2 violins, viola and cello
Bag o'Tales (1992) for saxophone quartet
Plexus (1991) for flute(pic), harp, viola and cello
Jag (1990) for flute, clarinet, trombone, violin and cello
Twenty Variations (1982) for flute and piano

Vocal
Lament (2021) text: Dylan Thomas and Welsh hymn “Llef” monodrama for bass/baritone, bass clarinet, percussion, piano, female chorus, and contrabass
I Heard an Angel Singing (2016) text: Mark Gustavson for soprano and fixed media
Fisherman Songs (2010) text: collection for bass/baritone and piano
The Four Love Songs (1984) for soprano, 2 clarinets, 2 percussion, viola and cello
The Three Mirrors (1979) text: Edwin Muir for soprano, flute(alto), clarinet, trombone, piano(hammond organ), 3 percussion (tuned water glasses)

Solo instrumental
The Lounge Pianist (2010) for vocalizing pianist
Trickster (1997) for clarinet solo
Dissolving Images (1986) for piano solo

Electroacoustic
Wingbeat (2021) for harp & 2-channel fixed audio
I Heard an Angel Singing (2016) for soprano & 2-channel fixed audio
Footfalls (2015) for fixed media
Air (2014) for fixed media

Multimedia 
In-between (2020) for 2-channel fixed audio & video (Chris Myhr, artist)

Discography
Dissolving Images, Lisa Moore, Edward Gilmore, Either/Or, Parnassus, Albany Records, Release date: July 1, 2013.
Chiftetelli, Contemporary Chamber Players of the University of Chicago, CD Baby, Release date: September 10, 2010.
Air: Music for Yoga and Meditation, Electroacoustic, Gustavson Sounds Records, Release date: September 2, 2016.
In-Between, Soundtrack, CD Baby, Release date: September 30, 2021.

Bibliography
Gustavson, Mark (1994) "Conversation in New York", Contemporary Music Review, Volume 10, American Composers: The Emerging Generation, pp. 121 – 132.

Notes and references

Sources
Maurice Hinson and Wesley Roberts, "Guide to the Pianist's Repertoire, Fourth Edition", Indiana University Press, 2013, p. 459
Patrick Hanudel, Album Review: "Gustavson: Chamber Music", "American Record Guide",  January/February 2014, p. 114
 Buell, Richard, "The Smart, Persuasive Sounds of Young Dinosaurs", Boston Globe, 7 February 2001. Accessed via subscription 2 March 2010.
Dyer, Richard, "Tanglewood Festival Celebrates Diversity of Contemporary Music", Boston Globe, 6 August 2006. Accessed via subscription 2 March 2010.
Gowan, Bradford, "Review: Dissolving Images by Mark Gustavson", The Piano quarterly, Issue 148, Winter 1988/89, p. 16
Griffiths, "Looking Eastward for Patterns and a Quiet Sensuality", New York Times, 10 October 1997. Accessed 2 March 2010.
Kozinn, Allan, "The Classical and the Vernacular, a Cohesive Choice of the Contemporary", New York Times, 2 August 2006. Accessed 2 March 2010.
Symphony Magazine, "BMI's 28th annual Student Composer Awards", Volume 31, Issues 3-5

External links
 NewMusicBox Sound Heard: Mark Gustavson—Dissolving Images Album Review, September 2, 2013
Mark Gustavson | American Composer Official Website
Kalvos & Damian Chronicle of the NonPop Revolution: A Fool's Journey Interview with Mark Gustavson, November 29, 2003

American male classical composers
American classical composers
20th-century classical composers
21st-century classical composers
1959 births
Living people
Musicians from Brooklyn
Writers from Brooklyn
University of Illinois alumni
Columbia University School of the Arts alumni
People from Mastic Beach, New York
21st-century American composers
20th-century American composers
Classical musicians from New York (state)
20th-century American male musicians
21st-century American male musicians